In the 1896–97 season, the Woolwich Arsenal F.C. played 30 games, won 13, drawn 4 and lost 13. The team finished 10th in the season

Results
Arsenal's score comes first

Football League Second Division

Final League table

FA Cup

References

1896-97
English football clubs 1896–97 season